The Madrasa Thaalibia, is a madrasa located in Algiers, Algeria. It was founded on  17 October 1904 by Charles Jonnart and subsequently became one of the leading spiritual and educational centres of Algeria.

Architecture 
The building of this madrasa was designed by the architect  (1856–1926). The style followed the Moorish Revival architecture under the guidance of Jonnart,

Four domes flank the central dome, a vestibule and a porch open between the two domes of the main façade. All the walls are lined, halfway up, with paneled earthenware faience and tiles.

For about fifty years since 1954, the building no longer has its vocation as a higher establishment for Medersians.

Teachers 
 Abdelhalim Bensmaia
 Mohamed Bencheneb
 
 
 
 Abderrazak Ashraf
 Mohamed Saïd Ben Zekri

Students 
 Omar Racim
 Si Kaddour Benghabrit
 
 Noureddine Abdelkader

See also 
 Charles Jonnart

References 

Algiers
Buildings and structures completed in 1904
Madrasas in Algeria
Madrasa Thaalibia
Madrasa Thaalibia
Madrasa Thaalibia
20th-century establishments in Algeria
Algeria
Moorish Revival architecture
Sufism in Algeria
20th-century madrasas
20th-century architecture in Algeria